Gevelsberg-Kipp station is a through station in the town of Gevelsberg in the German state of North Rhine-Westphalia. The station was opened on 1 June 1980 on a section of the Düsseldorf-Derendorf–Dortmund Süd railway, opened by the Rhenish Railway Company (RhE) between Wuppertal-Wichlinghausen and Hagen RhE station (now Hagen-Eckesey depot) on 15 September 1879. It has two platform tracks and it is classified by Deutsche Bahn as a category 6 station.

The station is served by Rhine-Ruhr S-Bahn line S 8 between Mönchengladbach and Hagen and line S 9 between Recklinghausen and Hagen, both every 60 minutes.

Notes

Rhine-Ruhr S-Bahn stations
S8 (Rhine-Ruhr S-Bahn)
S9 (Rhine-Ruhr S-Bahn)
Ennepe-Ruhr-Kreis
Railway stations in Germany opened in 1980